Percy Edward Roberts (20 September 1909 – 3 August 1943) was an Australian rules footballer who played with Fitzroy in the Victorian Football League (VFL).

Football career
Roberts came from Yarragon and made two appearances for Fitzroy as a 19-year-old defender early in the 1929 VFL season. He then left to play for Mornington. In the 1932 VFL season, Roberts returned to Fitzroy and played every game from rounds three to eighteen, a total of 16 appearances. It would be his only season back at Fitzroy, he was granted a clearance to Ballan in 1933.

War service
Roberts enlisted for armed service on 7 February 1941 and a year later, at the Fall of Singapore, was captured by the Japanese. He died of dysentery while a prisoner of war in Moulmein, British Burma on 3 August 1943.

References

External links

1909 births
Australian rules footballers from Victoria (Australia)
Fitzroy Football Club players
Australian prisoners of war
World War II prisoners of war held by Japan
Australian military personnel killed in World War II
Deaths from dysentery
1943 deaths
Australian Army personnel of World War II
Australian Army soldiers
Infectious disease deaths in Myanmar
Military personnel from Victoria (Australia)